Terje Egil Tolås Fjærn (25 August 1942 – 8 June 2016) was a Norwegian musician, orchestra leader and musical conductor. He was first married to singer Gro Anita Schønn (1950-2001) and later to Lillemor Korsell.

Discography

References 

2016 deaths
1942 births
Norwegian conductors (music)
Male conductors (music)
Norwegian musicians
Musicians from Molde
Eurovision Song Contest conductors